The Church of the Transfiguration (Preobrazhenska tserkva, or more formally Церква Преображення Господа Нашого Ісуса Христа, Tserkva preobrazhennia Hospoda Nashoho Isusa Khrysta) in Lviv, Ukraine is located in the city's Old Town, just north of the market square. 

It was originally built as the Roman Catholic church of the Holy Trinity of the Trinitarian Order, between 1703 and 1731, in the style of French classicism but with a Baroque interior. In 1783, the monastery was abolished by the Holy Roman Emperor Joseph II and the church was used as a library of the Lviv University, until it was destroyed by Austrian artillery during the Spring of Nations in 1848.

The ruins of the church were rebuilt by the Greek Catholic Church, and most of the original design was kept. However, an apse was added to the short presbytery and domes that now dominate the facade were built on the church's towers. The interior underwent much deeper changes to adapt it to the needs of Eastern Rite liturgy.

The church was reconsecrated on 29 April 1906, as the Greek Catholic church of the Transfiguration of Our Lord Jesus Christ, by the Ukrainian Metropolitan of Lviv Andrey Sheptytsky,  Bishop of Peremyshl Constantine (Chekhovych) and Bishop of Stanyslaviv Blessed Hryhory Khomyshyn. In the first half of the 20th century, the parish became one of the main cultural centres of the Ukrainian national movement. On 29 October 1989 this was the first parish to be restored with the imminent collapse of the Soviet Union.

Churches in Lviv
Ukrainian Catholic churches in Ukraine